Nelissen is a Dutch patronymic surname ("Nelis' son"). Nelis is a short form of the given name Cornelis. The name is most common in Dutch and Belgian Limburg. Among variant forms of the surname are Neelissen, Nelisse, Nelis, Nellis, and Nelles. Notable people with the surname include:

 (1879–1922), Dutch eclectic architect active in Belgium
Danny Nelissen (born 1970), Dutch former professional road bicycle racer and former
Jean Nelissen (1936–2010), Dutch sports journalist and commentator
 (born 1950), Belgian evolutionary biologist
Roelof Nelissen (born 1931), Dutch KVP politician, Deputy Prime Minister 1971–73
Wilfried Nelissen (born 1970), Belgian road racing cyclist
Neelissen
Catharina Neelissen (born 1961), Dutch Olympic rower
Nelisse/Nélisse
Isabelle Nélisse (born 2003), Canadian actress, sister of Sophie
Robin Nelisse (born 1978), Dutch football forward playing for the Netherlands Antilles
Sophie Nélisse (born 2000), Canadian actress, sister of Isabelle

References

Dutch-language surnames
Patronymic surnames